The Université du Québec en Abitibi-Témiscamingue (UQAT) is a public university within the Université du Québec network, with campuses in Val-d'Or and Rouyn-Noranda. It takes its name from the region it primarily serves.

Programs
The Université du Québec en Abitibi-Témiscamingue offers 95 programs in administration, accounting, teaching, engineering, multimedia, psychology, nursing, social work, interactive multimedia, youth communications, and art therapy. Students can choose to specialize in the disciplines of Electromechanical Engineering and Mechanical Engineering.

History

The Université was founded in 1970 as "Services universitaires dans le Nord-Ouest québécois". The university was subsequently renamed "Direction des études universitaires dans l’Ouest québécois" (1972), "Centre d’études universitaires dans l’Ouest québécois" (1976), and "Centre d’études universitaires en Abitibi-Témiscamingue" (1981). The university has been known as Université du Québec en Abitibi-Témiscamingue since 1983, when it split away from the administration of the Université du Québec à Trois-Rivières.

Residences
On-campus residences are now available in Rouyn-Noranda and Val-d'Or. Rental accommodations are also available in these communities.

Campuses
The Université du Québec en Abitibi-Témiscamingue is based in Rouyn-Noranda, Quebec. Additional satellite campuses are located in Val-d'Or (Centre d'Etude Supérieures Lucien-Cliche), which includes a pavilion for First Nations studies, and in Amos (Pavilion des Rapides), which specializes in forestry with a research centre focusing on ligniculture and silviculture, and in hydrogeology with a laboratory for groundwater research.

UQAT also has smaller learning centres in Notre-Dame-du-Nord, La Sarre, Matagami, and Duparquet.

Notable alumni
Notable people who have attended the university include:
 Christine Moore – NDP politician

Further reading
Ferretti, Lucia. L'Université en réseau: les 25 ans de l'Université du Québec. Sainte-Foy: Presses de l'Université du Québec, 1994.

References

External links
 Official site in French
Official site in English

Abitibi
Education in Abitibi-Témiscamingue
Rouyn-Noranda
Val-d'Or
Buildings and structures in Abitibi-Témiscamingue
Universities in Quebec